William Bocking (11 June 1902–1985) was an English footballer who played in the Football League for Everton and Stockport County.

References

1902 births
1985 deaths
English footballers
Association football defenders
English Football League players
Hyde United F.C. players
Stockport County F.C. players
Everton F.C. players